Sardar Muhammad Bux Khan Mahar is a Pakistani politician who had been a Member of the Provincial Assembly of Sindh, from May 2013 to May 2018.
He is Adviser to CM Sindh 2018 to 2019

He is elected as member of National Assembly on 23 July 2019 in a by election  defeating PTI & GDA backed independent candidate.

Early life 
He was born on 17 December 1987 in Mirpur Mathelo, Ghotki District.

Political career

He was elected to the Provincial Assembly of Sindh as a candidate of Pakistan Peoples Party from Constituency PS-8 (Ghotki-IV) in 2013 Pakistani general election.

In August 2016, he was inducted into the provincial Sindh cabinet of Chief Minister Syed Murad Ali Shah and was appointed as Provincial Minister of Sindh for Sports.

On 19 August 2018, he was inducted into the provincial Sindh cabinet of Chief Minister Syed Murad Ali Shah. On 20 August 2018, he was appointed as adviser to Chief Minister on industries and commerce. On 15 October 2018, he was allocated the additional ministerial portfolio of sports and youth affairs.

He took oath as Member of National Assembly of Pakistan on 1 August 2019.

References

Living people
Sindh MPAs 2013–2018
1987 births
Saraiki people
Pakistan People's Party politicians